The 2020 Individual Speedway World Championship Grand Prix Qualification was a series of motorcycle speedway meetings used to determine the three riders that qualified for the 2020 Speedway Grand Prix. The series consisted of four qualifying rounds at Glasgow, Žarnovica, Lamothe-Landerron and Abensberg and the Grand Prix Challenge at Goričan. The three riders that qualified were Matej Žagar, Niels-Kristian Iversen and Max Fricke.

Qualifying rounds

Final 
{| width=100%
|width=50% valign=top|

Grand Prix Challenge 
24 August 2019
 Goričan
 Pavlic was nominated as the wildcard.

See also 
 2020 Speedway Grand Prix

References 

Speedway Grand Prix Qualification
Speedway Grand Prix Qualifications
Qualification